Yunsi (29 March 1680 – 5 October 1726), born as Yinsi, was a Manchu prince of the Qing dynasty in China. The eighth son of the Kangxi Emperor, Yunsi was a pivotal figure in the power struggle over the succession to his father's throne. Yunsi was believed to be favoured by most officials in the imperial court to be the next emperor but ultimately lost the struggle to his fourth brother Yinzhen, who became the Yongzheng Emperor.

After the Yongzheng Emperor ascended the throne in 1723, Yunsi was named a top advisor to the new emperor and imperial chancellor, the head of the Lifan Yuan, in addition to being awarded the title "Prince Lian of the First Rank". He was removed from office four years later, his titles stripped, then he was banished from the imperial clan. He was charged with a litany of crimes and sent to prison, where he died in disgrace. He was posthumously rehabilitated during the Qianlong Emperor's reign.

Early life
Yunsi was born to the Kangxi Emperor and Consort Liang (née Wei Shuangjie), a Manchu woman of the Plain Yellow Banner, and raised by the Consort Hui, mother of Yinzhi, the first son of the Kangxi Emperor. Consort Liang was seen by some historians as coming from a disadvantaged background, because she was a member of the "Sin Jeku" slave caste before she became the Kangxi Emperor's consort. While the low status of her mother's family affected Yinsi's prestige within the ranks of the princes, it also gave Yinsi the impetus to overcome the odds through hard work and cultivating moral character.  Over time, Yinsi became one of the Kangxi Emperor's favourite sons. He was popular with officials at court, and his uncle Fuquan would often praise him in front of his father, the Kangxi Emperor. At the age of only 18, Yinsi was granted the rank of doroi beile, the third highest rank of nobility.

Succession struggle
The Kangxi Emperor had initially chosen Yinreng, his second son to survive into adulthood, as crown prince. However, towards the later years of the emperor's reign, Yinreng engaged in increasingly licentious activities and also established a strong political base revolving around his own authority, causing him to rapidly lose favour.  In 1708, during a hunting trip to Rehe, the Kangxi Emperor grew suspicious that the crown prince was conspiring to oust him in a coup. Yinreng was stripped of his position as crown prince and then placed under house arrest. Four days later, in an apparent sign of trust, the Kangxi Emperor commissioned Yinsi to oversee the imperial household department to 'clean house' and remove some vestiges of Yinreng's influence. However, Yinsi used this unique vantage point as an opportunity to curry favour with those previously loyal to Yinreng. Yinsi, widely known to have a strong base of support among the officials of court due to his moral character and wide range of talents, emerged as a serious contender for crown prince. The breadth of his support was his downfall, as it aroused suspicion from the emperor that Yinsi was competing for influence not against other princes but against the emperor himself.

Yinsi's support network, which included many top-ranking officials, the Ninth Prince Yintang, Tenth Prince Yin'e, and the 14th Prince Yinti, became a formidable clique in imperial affairs, bound together by their desire to see Yinsi become the next emperor. Collectively, this group became known as the Baye Dang, or the Eighth Lord Party. The Baye Dang often saw itself at odds with the Crown Prince Party, a similarly influential group bound by their interest of maintaining the position of the crown prince. Once Yinreng was removed as heir apparent, some supporters of Yinsi engaged in conspiracies to murder Yinreng.

Shortly after Yinreng was deposed as crown prince, Yinzhi, the eldest son of Kangxi, had run afoul of the emperor for casting sorcery spells against Yinreng. Yinzhi, seeing his own hopes of attaining the crown prince position evaporate, gave his backing to Yinsi, who had been raised in the household of his mother. At the behest of Yinzhi, a fortune teller by the name of Zhang Mingde was sent to Yinsi.  Zhang foretold that Yinsi was predestined for greatness. Yinzhi, long pre-occupied with supernatural ways to influence temporal affairs, relayed Zhang's seemingly auspicious predictions about Yinsi's future to the emperor in an attempt bolster Yinsi's case for becoming crown prince. In response, the emperor, rather than rewarding Yinsi, sentenced Zhang to death by lingchi in order to discourage others from becoming involved in the struggle for succession. The Zhang Mingde episode was a huge blow to Yinsi politically and resulted in his own house arrest.

The Kangxi Emperor, disillusioned by ambitions of his remaining sons and the ferocity with which they were plotting against one another, reinstated Yinreng in the crown prince position in 1709. However, the latter was once again stripped of his Crown Prince title a few years later. After the second removal, Kangxi became determined to select another prince as his successor. He issued an order for officials at court to divulge their own preferences on which of his sons should be the next crown prince.  In what became essentially a straw-poll vote, the majority of court officials petitioned to the Kangxi Emperor that Yinsi should assume the position of Crown Prince. The breadth of support for Yinsi had ostensibly caught the Kangxi emperor off guard. The emperor, in a stark about-face, declared the results of the mandarin vote tally invalid. The emperor became incensed at Yinsi's self-promotion in the struggles that ensued, and stripped him of his doroi beile title and stipend (later restored). Many other princes also became disgraced in the lengthy battle for succession. According to some historians, the Kangxi emperor had sensed that Yinsi had amassed greater clout than himself, ultimately pushing him to suppress any further ambition by Yinsi for the throne. Thereafter, Yinsi threw his weight behind the 14th Prince Yinti, who was seen by most observers as being destined for the throne.

Yongzheng reign
After his fourth brother, Yinzhen, succeeded their father and became known as the Yongzheng Emperor in 1722, Yinsi changed his name to "Yunsi" to avoid using the same character as the Yongzheng Emperor's personal name, considered taboo.

A few weeks after the death of the Kangxi Emperor, the Yongzheng Emperor enfeoffed Yunsi as "Prince Lian of the First Rank" (Manchu: hošoi hanja cin wang) and he sat on the emperor's top advisory board along with Yinxiang, Maci, and Longkodo. Yinsi was charged with overseeing the Lifan Yuan, the bureaucratic organ in charge of the affairs of the Qing dynasty suzerain lands such as Mongolia. Despite bestowing Yunsi with the highest honors, the Yongzheng Emperor targeted those court officials who were Yunsi allies. The Yongzheng Emperor frequently criticised Yunsi for not performing his duties properly. In 1724, for example, the emperor ordered Yunsi to kneel in the inner reaches of the Forbidden City for an entire night, ostensibly for an infraction committed during his oversight of the Lifan Yuan. In early 1725, the emperor forcibly exiled Yunsi's wife to the interior, and forbid all communication between the two. By 1725, Yunsi had completely lost favour with the emperor, and became the target of trumped-up charges and accusations that eventually led to the stripping of Yunsi's princely title, along with his banishment from the imperial clan.

After his banishment, Yunsi was forced to rename himself "Akina".

Yunsi died in captivity, four years after the Yongzheng Emperor's coronation. He was posthumously rehabilitated and restored to the imperial clan under the name "Yunsi" during the Qianlong Emperor's reign.

Meaning of "Akina"
"Āqínà" is a Chinese transliterating words of a Manchu term which has traditionally been translated as "pig" in Chinese. However it is a false rumour. Some scholars suggest the original Manchu term is "Acina", which actually means "to carry (with your crime)". But according to Hei tu dang (黑图档), a Manchu script document now kept in Liaoning Provincial Museum, the original term is "Akina". There is some dispute as to whether that is an accurate translation: "frozen fish", "fish on the chopping block", or "meat on the chopping block".

Location of residence
According to the Jingshi Fangxiang Zhigao (京师坊巷志稿), the Prince Lian family compound was located near Taijichang Road southeast of the Forbidden City, due west of the family compound of Fuquan, the Prince Yu. Its interior structure was altered shortly after Yunsi's expulsion from the imperial clan in 1725, and converted to a storehouse during the reign of the Qianlong Emperor. Nevertheless, some parts of the original structure may have survived to the present day. Its approximate location is near the present-day Wangfujing Station of the Beijing Subway, near the Ministry of Commerce of the People's Republic of China.

Family 
Primary Consort

 Primary consort, of the Gorolo clan (嫡福晉 郭絡羅氏; d. 1726)

Concubine

 Mistress, of the Zhang clan (張氏)
 Hongwang (弘旺; 27 January 1708 – 16 December 1762), first son

 Mistress, of the Mao clan (毛氏)
 Princess of the Third Rank (郡主; 24 June 1708 – 11 January 1776), first daughter
 Married Sun Wufu (孫五福) in July/August 1724

Ancestry

In fiction and popular culture
 Portrayed by Eric Wan in The Rise and Fall of Qing Dynasty (1988)
 Portrayed by Mark Cheng in Legend of YungChing (1997)
 Portrayed by Wang Huichun in Yongzheng Dynasty (1999), Li Wei the Magistrate (2001) and Li Wei the Magistrate II (2004)
 Portrayed by Savio Tsang in The King of Yesterday and Tomorrow (2003)
 Portrayed by Huang Leixin in Huang Taizi Mishi (2004)
 Portrayed by Liu Dekai in The Book and the Sword (2008)
 Portrayed by Feng Shaofeng in Palace (2011) and Palace II (2012)
 Portrayed by Kevin Cheng in Scarlet Heart (2011)
 Portrayed by Louis Cheung in Gilded Chopsticks (2014)
 Portrayed by He Zhi Long in Dreaming Back to the Qing Dynasty (2019)

See also
 Royal and noble ranks of the Qing dynasty
 Ranks of imperial consorts in China#Qing

References

Further reading
 

Kangxi Emperor's sons
Manchu Plain Yellow Bannermen
Manchu politicians
Chinese people who died in prison custody
Prisoners who died in Chinese detention
1681 births
1726 deaths
Qing dynasty politicians from Beijing